Ceropegia is a genus of plants within the family Apocynaceae, native to Africa, southern Asia, and Australia.  It was named by Carl Linnaeus, who first described this genus in his Genera plantarum, which appeared in 1737. Linnaeus referred to the description and picture of a plant in the Horti Malabarici as the plant for which the genus was created. In 1753 he named this species as Ceropegia candelabrum. Linnaeus did not explain the etymology but later explanations stated that the name Ceropegia was from the Greek word keropegion κηροπηγɩον. This means candelabrum in Latin, which has a broader range than the modern word - "a candlestick, a branched candlestick, a chandelier, candelabrum, or also lamp-stand, light-stand, sometimes of exquisite workmanship".

An alternative explanation for the name was given later by William Jackson Hooker in 1830 in Curtis's Botanical Magazine in the description of Ceropegia elegans: "From κηρός, wax, and πηγή, a fountain, in allusion to the delicate, waxy umbels of some species". However, four years later Hooker gave the etymology in the description in the same periodical of Ceropegia lushii as "remarkable for the peculiar shape of its flowers, frequently arranged in umbels, hence its name κηροπηγɩον, a candelabrum, or lamp-stand".

They have many common names including lantern flower, parasol flower, parachute flower, bushman's pipe, string of hearts, snake creeper, wine-glass vine, rosary vine, and necklace vine.

Ceropegia species are traded, kept, and propagated as ornamental plants. In Africa, the roots and leaves of some species are eaten raw and the tubers in India are eaten raw or stewed in curries.

Appearance

The stems are vining or trailing in most species, though a few species from the Canary Islands have erect growth habits. Among some species, such as Ceropegia woodii, the nodes swell, and the roots similarly expand to form tubers beneath the soil surface. The leaves are simple and opposite, although they can be rudimentary or absent. Especially in certain succulent species, the leaves may also be thick and fleshy.

The flowers have a tubular corolla with five petals most often fused at the tips, forming an umbrella-like canopy, a cage, or appendage-like antennae. The flowers of this genus are adapted for pollination by flies. A great diversity of fly species are associated with ceropegias. The flowers are often inflated and fused at several points, forming a cage. Flies become momentarily trapped inside, accomplishing pollination as they move about.

Classification
The genus Ceropegia belongs to the subfamily Asclepiadoideae (milkweeds) within the family Apocynaceae. Species of this genus bear similarities to the carrion flowers or stapelias. There are at least 420 known species. More are being discovered and described regularly. They are distributed throughout most of sub-Saharan Africa and Madagascar to the Arabian Peninsula, southeast Asia, the Canary Islands, the tropical Pacific, and Australia.

A generic complex, with many interesting taxonomic problems at both generic and specific level, is formed by three genera: Ceropegia, Brachystelma and Riocreuxia.

Selected species

Gallery

References

External links

Ceropegia. Flickr Group.

 
Apocynaceae genera